Ammapattinam is a coastal village in Pudukkottai district of Tamil Nadu, India with an exclusively Tamil Muslim population.

Demographics
According to the 2011 Census:

 Total population 6,652
 Males                3,355
 Females            3, 297
 Muslims            91.48%
 Hindu                05.92%
 Christian           02.57%
 Others              00.03%

 Female sex ratio 983
 Literacy rate 91.69% - higher than the state average of 80.09%
 Male literacy      97.21%
 Female literacy   86.06%
 Total houses      1,394

References

External Links
https://www.ammapattinam.com

Villages in Pudukkottai district